The Right Reverend John Charles Mann (1880 – January 19, 1967) was an  English Anglican bishop who served as Bishop of Kyushu in Japan. 

A graduate of the University of Glasgow, he was ordained in 1903. During his first curacy at St Luke Maidstone he applied to be a CMS missionary, His mission work for the Nippon Sei Ko Kai started in Nagasaki in 1905. He was consecrated Bishop of Kyushu, an Anglican diocese  in 1935. He served until 1940. In retirement he was an Assistant Bishop in the Diocese of Rochester.

References

External links 
Glimpses of Missionary Work in the Diocese of South Japan (Kyushu), by Arthur Lea

20th-century Anglican bishops in Asia
Anglican Church in Japan
1880 births
1967 deaths
Alumni of the University of Glasgow
Anglican bishops of Kyushu